Jean-Louis Matinier  (born 1963 in Nevers, France) is a leading contemporary accordion player in the fields of jazz and world music.

Life and work
Matinier studied classical music, then turned to jazz and other forms of improvised music. From 1989 to 1991 he played in the French National Jazz Orchestra.
His way of playing is strongly influenced by the attitude of a European, chamber jazz, with its specific uptake of the accordion tradition affects the music but also relaxing. His compositions are imaginative and he turns his instrument versatile. Matinier occurs usually with other instrumentalists, such as with Renaud Garcia-Fons, who accompanied him in a very interactive duo on his bass. In Germany, he first became known through performances with Michael Riessler. Matinier has previously collaborated with Louis Sclavis, Gianluigi Trovesi, Michel Godard, François Couturier, Philippe Caillat, and Anouar Brahem.

Selected discography
 Another World w/ Dave Friedman & Anthony Cox
 2001: Fuera w/ Renaud Garcia-Fons
 2004: Confluences w/ Renaud García- Fons, Bobby Rangell & Nelson Veras
 2014: Inventio (ECM 2348) w/ Marco Ambrosini
With Anouar Brahem
 2002: Le Pas du Chat Noir (ECM 1792) w/ François Couturier 
 2006: Le Voyage de Sahar (ECM 1915) w/ François Couturier
With François Couturier / Tarkovsky Quartet
 2006: Nostalghia – A Song for Tarkovsky (ECM 1979)
 2011: Tarkovsky Quartet (ECM 2159)
 2017: Nuit blanche (ECM 2524)
With Louis Sclavis
 2000: Dans la Nuit (ECM 1805)

External links
 Biography of Jean-Louis Martinier at allmusic.com: http://www.allmusic.com/artist/jean-louis-matinier-mn0000813316/biography

1963 births
Living people
French accordionists
Jazz accordionists
People from Nevers
21st-century accordionists